Progne is a genus of passerine birds in the swallow family Hirundinidae. The species are found in the New World and all have "martin" in their common name.

Taxonomy
The genus Progne was introduced in 1826 by the German zoologist Friedrich Boie for the purple martin. The genus name refers to Procne (Πρόκνη), a mythological girl who was turned into a swallow to save her from her husband. She had killed their son to avenge the rape of her sister.

The genus contains nine species:

References

 
Hirundinidae
Bird genera